The 2013–14 New Mexico Lobos men's basketball team represented the University of New Mexico during the 2013–14 NCAA Division I men's basketball season as a member of the Mountain West Conference. They played their home games at The Pit in Albuquerque, New Mexico. The Lobos were led by first year head coach Craig Neal. They finished the season 27–7, 15–3 in Mountain West play to finish in second place. They were champions of the Mountain West tournament, their third consecutive conference tournament championship, to earn an automatic bid to the NCAA tournament where they lost in the second round to Stanford.

Off season

Departures

Incoming transfers

Recruiting

Roster

Schedule and results

|-
!colspan=12 style="background:#D3003F; color:white;"| Exhibition
|-

|-
!colspan=12 style="background:#D3003F; color:white;"| Regular season

|-
!colspan=12 style="background:#D3003F; color:white;"| Conference regular season

|-
!colspan=12 style="background:#D3003F; color:white;"|  Mountain West tournament

|-
!colspan=12 style="background:#D3003F; color:white;"|  NCAA tournament

Rankings

See also 
 2013–14 New Mexico Lobos women's basketball team

References 

New Mexico Lobos men's basketball seasons
New Mexico
New Mexico
2013 in sports in New Mexico
2014 in sports in New Mexico